Aberdeenshire East (Gaelic: Siorrachd Obar Dheathain an Ear) is a constituency of the Scottish Parliament (Holyrood) covering part of the council area of  Aberdeenshire. It elects one Member of the Scottish Parliament (MSP) by the first past the post method of election. It is also one of ten constituencies in the North East Scotland electoral region, which elects seven additional members, in addition to the ten constituency MSPs, to produce a form of proportional representation for the region as a whole.

The seat was created for the 2011 election, and largely consists of areas that were in the former constituency of Gordon. It has been held by Gillian Martin of the Scottish National Party since the 2016 Scottish Parliament election.

Electoral region

The other nine constituencies of the North East Scotland region are Aberdeen Central, Aberdeen Donside, Aberdeen South and North Kincardine, Aberdeenshire West, Angus North and Mearns, Angus South, Banffshire and Buchan Coast, Dundee City East and Dundee City West.

The region covers all of the Aberdeen City council area, the Aberdeenshire council area, the Angus council area, the Dundee City council area and part of the Moray council area.

Constituency boundaries and council area 

Aberdeenshire is represented by four constituencies in the Scottish Parliament: Aberdeenshire East, Aberdeenshire West, Angus North and Mearns and Banffshire and Buchan Coast.

The electoral wards used in the creation of Aberdeenshire East are:

In full: Central Buchan, Turriff and District, Mid-Formartine, Ellon and District, Inverurie and District
In part: Peterhead South and Cruden (shared with Banffshire and Buchan Coast), East Garioch (shared with Aberdeenshire West)

It was created for the 2011 election, mostly replacing Gordon.

Member of the Scottish Parliament
First contested in the 2011 election, the seat was won by Alex Salmond, who was then First Minister, and had previously held the Gordon seat, from which Aberdeenshire East was largely formed. Salmond had also previously been MSP for Banff and Buchan from 1999 until resigning in 2001, as well as representing the Westminster seat of Banff and Buchan from 1987 until retiring from the British Parliament in 2010.

Election results

2020s

This was the largest Conservative vote share increase at the 2021 Scottish Parliament election.

2010s

References

External links

Politics of Aberdeenshire
Scottish Parliament constituencies and regions from 2011
Constituencies of the Scottish Parliament
Constituencies established in 2011
2011 establishments in Scotland
Ellon, Aberdeenshire
Turriff
Inverurie
Alex Salmond